Michael Alan McGrath (October 27, 1942 – January 27, 2021) was an American politician and businessman. He was the first openly gay Minnesota state officer.

McGrath was born in Trenton, New Jersey. He graduated from high school in New Smyrna Beach, Florida, in 1961. He served in the United States Air Force before marrying Marsha Palmer of New Smyrna Beach, attending Daytona Beach Community College, and graduating from Stetson University in 1969 with a bachelor's degree in American Studies.

McGrath was employed by International Dairy Queen, Inc., in Bloomington, Minnesota, from 1972 to 1984, ending as a vice president. He next worked as a business consultant and taxi driver, and was active in grassroots politics before defeating the DFL incumbent in the 1986 primary and general elections for Minnesota State Treasurer. He was re-elected in 1990 and 1994 and served until 1999. He also served as president of the National Association of State Treasurers.

McGrath's longtime assistant, Carol Johnson, was elected as the final State Treasurer of Minnesota in 1998 following passage of a constitutional amendment to abolish the office on the same ballot.

Michael and Marsha McGrath raised three children before divorcing in 2002. Michael married again in 2013 following marriage equality becoming law in Minnesota.

References 

1942 births
Living people
People from Bloomington, Minnesota
Politicians from Saint Paul, Minnesota
Military personnel from Minnesota
Stetson University alumni
Businesspeople from Minnesota
Minnesota Democrats
State treasurers of Minnesota